Scrinium neozelanicum is a species of sea snail, a marine gastropod mollusk in the family Mitromorphidae.

Description
The length of the shell attains 10 mm, its diameter 4.8 mm.

(Original description) The small, ovate, solid shell is slightly turriculate. It shows blunt axial ribs and spiral lirae, maculated with brown and white below the shoulder. The sculpture consists of rather distant, low, rounded axial ribs, nine to ten on the body whorl, extending on the spire whorls from the angle to the suture below, but only over the periphery on the body whorl. They are crossed by subequal, flat, spiral lirae, fine on the shoulder, broad upon the base, separated by linear interstices. The colour of the protoconch is flavescent, the other spire whorls are yellowish or brownish white, maculated with brown and white below the shoulder. The ribs are usually white, the interstices brown. The body whorl is light brown below the maculations on the periphery. The aperture is fulvous inside. The spire is conic, turriculate, very little higher than the aperture. The protoconch is papillate and consists of two smooth convex whorls. The shell contains 6 whorls, the last high in proportion, with a sloping, broad, and lightly excavated shoulder, slightly convex below the inconspicuous angle. The body whorl is convex, but faintly contracted at the base. The suture is distinct, but little impressed. The aperture is lightly oblique, elongately oval, angled above, with a rudimentary, broad, and truncated siphonal canal below. The outer lip is convex, rather thin and sharp, smooth inside, with a very slight broad sinus below the suture. The columella is vertical, excavated toward the parietal wall, slightly turned to the left below. The inner lip is narrow, thin, spreading over the convex parietal wall, tapering to a fine point below and extending to the base of the siphonal canal. The oval operculum is very small, length 2.1 mm., the nucleus apical.

Distribution
This marine species is endemic to New Zealand off Northland to Bay of Plenty.

References

 Hedley, C. 1922. A revision of the Australian Turridae. Records of the Australian Museum 13(6): 213–359, pls 42–56
 Powell, A.W.B. 1979: New Zealand Mollusca: Marine, Land and Freshwater Shells, Collins, Auckland 
 Spencer, H.G., Marshall, B.A. & Willan, R.C. (2009). Checklist of New Zealand living Mollusca. pp. 196–219. in: Gordon, D.P. (ed.) New Zealand inventory of biodiversity. Volume one. Kingdom Animalia: Radiata, Lophotrochozoa, Deuterostomia. Canterbury University Press, Christchurch

External links
 Spencer H.G., Willan R.C., Marshall B.A. & Murray T.J. (2011). Checklist of the Recent Mollusca Recorded from the New Zealand Exclusive Economic Zone
 
 New Zealand Mollusca: Scrinium neozelanicum

neozelanicum
Gastropods described in 1908
Gastropods of New Zealand